Henri Chevreau (27 April 1823 – 26 May 1903) was a French Bonapartist politician of the Second French Empire and French Third Republic. He was a grand officer of the Legion of Honour. He served as minister of the interior in the Government of France.

Sources 
 « Chevreau (Julien-Théophile-Henri) », dans Pierre Larousse, Grand dictionnaire universel du XIXe siècle, 15 vol., 1863-1890

External links
 Fiche Ministère de l'Intérieur

1823 births
1903 deaths
Grand Officiers of the Légion d'honneur
French interior ministers
Bonapartists